The Advance Australia Party (AAP), founded in 1988 as the Rex Connor Labor Party, was a minor political party in Australia. It was a populist party founded on a platform of Australian nationalism.

History
The party was founded in 1988 by the son of former Whitlam Government Minister, Rex Connor, after leaving the Australian Labor Party. The party was formed in opposition to the embracing of social and economic liberalism by the Liberal and Labor parties. It was registered on 14 July 1989, but deregistered by the Australian Electoral Commission (AEC) on 5 December 2005 for failing to endorse a candidate in the previous four years.

Connor contested the 1990 federal election in the seat of Cunningham and received 12.8% of the vote, contesting Throsby in 1993 and received 10.48% of the vote. The party last contested a federal election in 2001.

As of 2006, the President of AAP was Rex Connor Jnr.

New South Wales party
A party of the same name was formed in 2019 to contest the New South Wales state election. According to its website, the leader was Ray Brown, a former deputy mayor of The Hills Shire Council. Brown was also leader of the Building Australia Party.

References

External links
AAP President's Statement
Platform, Policies & Brief History

Political parties established in 1988
1988 establishments in Australia
Australian nationalist parties
Nationalist parties in Oceania
Political parties disestablished in 2005
2005 disestablishments in Australia